First-seeded Don Budge defeated fourth-seeded John Bromwich 6–4, 6–2, 6–1 in the final to win the men's singles tennis title at the 1938 Australian Championships.

Seeds
The seeded players are listed below. Don Budge is the champion; others show the round in which they were eliminated.

 Don Budge (champion)
 Gottfried von Cramm (semifinals)
 Henner Henkel (third round)
 John Bromwich (finalist)
 Adrian Quist (semifinals)
 Vivian McGrath (quarterfinals)
 Jack Crawford (third round)
 Gene Mako (quarterfinals)

Draw

Finals

Earlier rounds

Section 1

Section 2

Section 3

Section 4

References

External links
 

1938 in Australian tennis
1938
Men's Singles